Frank Burr Mallory (November 12, 1862 – September 27, 1941) was an American pathologist at the Boston City Hospital and Professor of Pathology at Harvard Medical School, after whom the Mallory body is named.

The Pathology Department at Boston City Hospital, the Mallory Institute of Pathology, was named after him.

Early life and career 
Mallory was born in Cleveland, Ohio on 12 November 1862 to George Burr and Anne (Faragher) Mallory, and received his medical degree in 1890 from Harvard Medical School. He became an assistant pathologist at Boston City Hospital in 1891, working under William Thomas Councilman.

He married Persis McClain Tracy of Chautauqua, New York in 1893.

In 1893 Mallory traveled to Europe to train under Hans Chiari in Prague and Ernst Ziegler in Freiburg.

After returning to Harvard, he became an Assistant Professor in 1896, and Associate Professor of Pathology in 1901. He became Professor of Pathology at Harvard Medical School from 1928 to 1932.

His contributions in the field of pathology included improving techniques and standardisation of tissue staining; his book, written with James Homer Wright, was the standard textbook in this field. He also studied the function of histiocytes, he confirmed that the whooping cough bacillus discovered by Jules Bordet was the causative agent, and he worked on improvements in classification of tumours, particularly meningiomas, and cirrhosis of the liver.

He was president of the American Association of Pathologists and Bacteriologists in 1910, and was its treasurer from 1911 to 1940. He was the editor of the Journal of Medical Research from 1923, and then founding editor of the American Journal of Pathology from 1925 to 1940.

Honors and awards 
Mallory received honorary degrees from Tufts University (Sc.D., 1928) and Boston University (Sc.D., 1932), and was awarded the Kober medal in 1935 by the Association of American Physicians for outstanding service in pathology.

Legacy 
Mallory died in Boston on September 27, 1941, at the age of 78.

He had two sons, both of whom were medical doctors and pathologists.  Tracy B. Mallory was Chief of Pathology at Massachusetts General Hospital in Boston, succeeding James Homer Wright in 1926, and president of the American Association of Pathologists and Bacteriologists in 1951.  His other son, George Kenneth Mallory, became Professor of Pathology at Boston City Hospital in 1948, and the Mallory-Weiss syndrome is named after him.

References

Further reading 
 Louis, David N.; Young, Robert H., (editors), ''Keen minds to explore the dark continents of disease : a history of the pathology services at Massachusetts General Hospital", Boston, Mass. : Massachusetts General Hospital, 2011. 

1862 births
1941 deaths
American pathologists
Harvard Medical School alumni
Harvard Medical School faculty
Harvard College alumni